"All Strung Out Over You" was an early hit for The Chambers Brothers. It featured Lester Chambers on lead vocals. It would later be sampled by Fatboy Slim for "Weapon of Choice".

Info on the song
The song was composed by Rudy Clark. The Chambers Brothers recorded the song and it was released on Columbia 4-43957 on December 19, 1966.
It was rushed out by Columbia after the label had rejected an early version of "Time Has Come Today". It became a regional hit for the group which gave them the opportunity to re-record "The Time Has Come Today".

The song appeared as the A1 track of their 1967 album The Time Has Come.  Years later, along with "Into My Own Thing" by Sly & the Family Stone, the song would be sampled for the song "Weapon of Choice by Fat Boy Slim which also featured Bootsy Collins.

Action
By January 11, 1967, the song had moved from its previous position of 48 up to 34 on the WMCA chart. By the 28th of that month, Billboard had recorded the single as a regional breakout.

Reaction to the song
For its cowbell effect, the song is noted at the Ultimate Cowbell Database.

References

The Chambers Brothers songs
1966 singles
Columbia Records singles
Funk rock songs
1966 songs
Songs written by Rudy Clark